Hazel Ann Mendoza (born Lourdes Angelic Teofisto Pla on 26 April 1988) is a Filipino former actress and a former Star Magic talent. Her late father was Spanish-English and also the father of former actress Nadia Montenegro. She became an artist of GMA Network for half-year.

Education
Mendoza studied in Adamson University with the degree in Bachelor of Science in education.

Current and last career
In 2009, Mendoza moved back to GMA Network via Darna and Bantatay for her last appearance in 2010 until she decided to leave show business.

Filmography

Television

Movies

References

External links

1988 births
Filipino child actresses
Filipino film actresses
Filipino television actresses
Filipino people of Spanish descent
Living people
People from Barcelona
Spanish people of Filipino descent
Participants in Philippine reality television series
ABS-CBN personalities
Star Magic